Niger Tornadoes Football Club is a soccer club based in Minna, Nigeria. They currently play in the Nigerian Professional Football League. Their home stadium is Bako Kontagora Stadium and have also played home game at Confluence Stadium in Lokoja.

History
In 2005 they finished in the lower half of the Nigerian Premier League but avoided relegation by three points. The club has suffered financial difficulties, with players complaining of unpaid salaries and bonuses.

After an 0–3 start to the 2008–09 season the entire management was sacked. The replacements at chairman (David Suleiman) and manager (Danladi Nasidi) had the same positions at the club from 2004–05 when they finished 13th and 14th in the Premier League. On November 15, the team hired Justin Tenger as technical adviser, a role he had until 2004.

They were relegated from the Premier League in 2012 on goal difference after scoring 38 goals in 36 games. Thirteen of the goals were scored by Sibi Gwar who was the league's top scorer. They won promotion again in 2015 after winning the Nigeria National League.

Niger Tornadoes were promoted back to the top division in 2015. Coach Abdullahi Biffo led them to a promotion spot which they clinched after defeating Mighty Jets F.C. 2–0.

Niger Tornadoes were runners up in the Nigerian FA Cup in 2017 after losing on penalties to Akwa United.

The club was fined N1 million in 2019 for crowd troubles in a game against Bendel Insurance.

Achievements
Nigerian FA Cup: 1
2000

National Second Division: 2
1996, 2015

Performance in CAF competitions
CAF Cup Winners' Cup: 1 appearance
2001 – Quarter-finals

WAFU Club Championship: 1 appearance
2010 – Quarter-finals

Current team
As of 11 February 2019

References

Football clubs in Nigeria
Association football clubs established in 1977
1977 establishments in Nigeria